is a Japanese LGBT rights activist, member of the House of Representatives for the Constitutional Democratic Party of Japan and retired karateka and taekwondoin. She is also former member of the House of Councilors, and a former member of the Osaka Prefectural Assembly (April 2003–April 2007). One of only seven women in the 110-member Osaka Assembly, Otsuji represented the Sakai-ku, Sakai City constituency. In May 2013, after her party member of the House resigned, Otsuji became the nation's first openly gay member of the Diet, but her term in office expired in July. She won a seat in the 2017 general election and became the first openly gay member of the House of Representatives.

Early life 
Otsuji was born in Nara Prefecture, but grew up in Hannan, Osaka. As a schoolgirl in Kobe, Otsuji was an Asian Junior karate champion, then later enrolled at Seoul University to study Korean and taekwondo. She lost by TKO to Yoriko Okamoto in 1999.  She had hoped to go to the Sydney Olympics in 2000 but was unsuccessful in making the national team. She returned to Japan and enrolled at Doshisha University in Kyoto, where she first became interested in politics.

Career 

Otsuji stood for election as an Independent in April 2003, at 28 becoming the youngest person ever elected to the Osaka Assembly. She later joined Rainbow and Greens, a new Japanese political coalition dedicated to developing an alternative society based on ecological politics, participatory political ideas and decentralisation. She contested the 2007 House of Councillors election on the Democratic Party of Japan list for the national proportional representation block but was not elected. However, in May 2013 when incumbent member Kunihiko Muroi, Otsuji took up his spot and became the first openly homosexual Diet member. As Otsuji did not run in the 2013 House of Councillors election, she left office at the end of the term in July.

Otsuji returned to the Diet in October 2017, this time to the more powerful House of Representatives. She contested Osaka's 2nd district for the CDP. Despite finishing third in the district, she obtained a sufficiently high proportion of votes to be returned through the CDP list for the Kinki proportional representation block. Her election is another watershed for the Diet as she became the first openly gay House of Representatives member in history. She again became the only openly gay Diet member that term, a distinction she still holds as of today.

Sexuality 
In August 2005, Otsuji published an autobiography , and in doing so came out as Japan's first lesbian politician, the day before 2005 Tokyo Pride.

In 2005, Otsuji was instrumental in bringing about a legislative change that allows same-sex couples to rent housing from the Osaka Prefectural Housing Corporation, a privilege previously reserved for married couples. Since same-sex marriages are not recognised under Japanese law, gay couples in Osaka had previously found it impossible to rent public housing.

In March–April 2006, Otsuji attended International Lesbian and Gay Association's world conference in Geneva.

In June 2006, Otsuji visited the United States on a trip sponsored by the International Visitor Leadership Program of the US Department of State. During her visit she met representatives from the National Center for Transgender Equality, the National Association of LGBT Community Centers, the National Gay and Lesbian Task Force, Freedom to Marry and the Stonewall Democrats.

In June 2007, Otsuji held a public wedding ceremony in Nagoya with her partner Maki Kimura, although same-sex marriages are not legally recognised in Japan.

Otsuji did not stand for re-election in April 2007. Her first term in the Osaka Assembly expired on April 29, 2007, but in July 2007 she appeared on the official candidate list of the Democratic Party of Japan, becoming the first-ever openly homosexual serious contender for election to the National Diet. Otsuji received 38,230 votes, far short of securing the seat, so there were no openly homosexual elected officials in Japan until the election of Taiga Ishikawa, an assemblyman in Tokyo's Toshima ward, in 2011.

August 22, 2009, is the world premiere of director Naomi Hiltz's documentary film Kanako: Challenging The System at the Vancouver Queer Film Festival. The film covers the last 17 days of the campaign, ending with election day.

References

External links 
 Japan Times — Lesbian politician Kanako Otsuji talks about gender issues in Japan
 Japan Media Review — Osaka Legislator 'Comes Out' in Autobiography
 TransNews Annex — Japan's first openly gay politician speaks up for nation's silent minorities — IHT/Asahi
 — Article on Otsuji's wedding in Pink News
 - New Beginnings for Gay Movement: Kanako Otsuji at Fridae.com (Empowering Gay Asia)
 — Japanzine - The Lesbian Politician

1974 births
Living people
Female members of the House of Representatives (Japan)
Members of the House of Representatives (Japan)
Constitutional Democratic Party of Japan politicians
Democratic Party of Japan politicians
21st-century Japanese women politicians
21st-century Japanese politicians
Lesbian politicians
Japanese LGBT politicians
Japanese LGBT rights activists
People from Kobe
People from Hannan, Osaka
People from Nara, Nara
Japanese female taekwondo practitioners
Kochi University alumni
LGBT legislators
Lesbian sportswomen
Japanese LGBT sportspeople
LGBT taekwondo practitioners